James Harry Beatty (March 11, 1890 – February 18, 1966) was a Canadian politician. He served in the Legislative Assembly of British Columbia from 1928 to 1933 from the electoral district of Victoria City, as a Conservative.

References

British Columbia Conservative Party MLAs
1890 births
1966 deaths
People from Hastings County